Peter Patrick Phoenix (31 December 1936 – 14 April 2020) was an English footballer who played as a left winger in the Football League.

Phoenix began his playing career with Tamworth, before being spotted by Oldham Athletic, where he made his Football League debut in February 1958.

Career statistics
Source:

References

External links

1936 births
2020 deaths
English footballers
People from Urmston
Association football midfielders
Tamworth F.C. players
Oldham Athletic A.F.C. players
Rochdale A.F.C. players
Exeter City F.C. players
Southport F.C. players
Stockport County F.C. players
Witton Albion F.C. players
English Football League players
Manchester City F.C. players
Stoke City F.C. players
Wigan Athletic F.C. players
Bangor City F.C. players